The men's 400m freestyle S11 event at the 2008 Summer Paralympics took place at the Beijing National Aquatics Center on 11 September. There were two heats; the swimmers with the eight fastest times advanced to the final.

Results

Heats
Competed from 10:50.

Heat 1

Heat 2

Final
Competed at 18:49.

 
Q = qualified for final.

References
 
 

Swimming at the 2008 Summer Paralympics